Thomas Ewing Sherman, S.J. (October 12, 1856 – April 29, 1933) was an American lawyer, educator, and Catholic priest. He was the fourth child and second son of Union Army General William Tecumseh Sherman and his wife Ellen Ewing Sherman.

Life
Tom Sherman, as he was commonly known, was named after his maternal grandfather Thomas Ewing, a U.S. Senator and cabinet secretary. Tom was born in San Francisco, California, while his father worked there as a bank executive. His mother, Ellen, was of Irish ancestry on her mother's side and devoutly Catholic. During the American Civil War (1861–1865), Tom's father rose to become one of the most important generals in the United States Army. When his superior, Ulysses S. Grant, became President of the United States, William Tecumseh Sherman was appointed commanding general of the army.

Tom was brought up in St. Louis and Washington. He attended the preparatory department of Georgetown College and graduated with a B.A. degree from that institution in 1874. He then entered Yale University's Sheffield Scientific School as a graduate student in English literature. He received a law degree from Washington University in St. Louis in 1878 and was admitted to the bar, but to his father's great and lasting displeasure he soon gave up the profession of the law in order to study for priesthood in the Roman Catholic Church. That same year he joined the Jesuit Order and studied for three years in Jesuit novitiates in London, England, and Frederick, Maryland. He was ordained as priest in 1889 by a friend of his mother's, Archbishop Patrick Ryan of Philadelphia; and belonged to the Western Province of the Jesuit Order (headquarters in St. Louis). He taught for some years in Jesuit colleges, principally at Saint Louis University and in Detroit.

He presided over General Sherman's funeral mass in 1891 and was in demand as a public lecturer, frequently speaking out against anti-Catholic prejudice in the United States. He obtained a commission as an army chaplain during the Spanish–American War of 1898, without consulting his Jesuit superiors. Beginning in 1899, he used St. Ignatius College Prep in Chicago as his base for speaking and writing. While in his mid-fifties, he began experiencing mental problems and long bouts of clinical depression. In 1914, he withdrew from the Jesuit community and lived in various places in Europe and the United States before settling in Santa Barbara, California. In poor health, after 1931 he lived with his wealthy niece Eleanor Sherman Fitch in New Orleans, Louisiana, where he died of acute dilation of the heart and arteriosclerosis, at the age of 76. He had renewed his Jesuit vows just shortly before his death.

Father Sherman is buried next to Father John Salter, the nephew of Confederate Vice President Alexander Stephens, at St. Charles Borromeo Jesuit Cemetery in Grand Coteau. This is coincidental, as Father Salter was the next priest of the local Jesuit community to be buried there.

References

External links
 Biography, from Company Magazine
 
 Thomas Ewing Sherman
 William T. Sherman – Notre Dame University
 
 Letters of Thomas Sherman to his father

References
 General Sherman's Son: The Life of Thomas Ewing Sherman, S.J.; Joseph T. Durkin, S.J.; New York: Farrar, Straus & Cudahy, 1959

1856 births
1933 deaths
American Roman Catholic priests
19th-century American Jesuits
20th-century American Jesuits
Georgetown College (Georgetown University) alumni
Washington University School of Law alumni
Yale University alumni
United States Army chaplains
Spanish–American War chaplains
Sherman family (U.S.)